Jean Isabel Smith (born September 7, 1957), credited professionally as J. Smith-Cameron, is an American actress. She spent a majority of her career in theatre but began transitioning to film and television later in life. She is known for her supporting roles as Janet Talbot on the television series Rectify and Gerri Kellman on Succession. For the latter, she received a nomination for the Primetime Emmy Award for Outstanding Supporting Actress in a Drama Series in 2022.

Early life and education
Jean Isabel Smith was born in Louisville, Kentucky, the daughter of architect Richard Sharp Smith and granddaughter of architect Richard Sharp Smith. She was raised in Greenville, South Carolina. 

She attended Florida State University for one year and was enrolled in its School of Theatre, where she met film director Victor Nuñez, who cast her as a lead in his film Gal Young 'Un (1979). She additionally received acting training at HB Studio in New York City.

She began being credited as "J. Smith" in college out of concern that her first name, Jeannie, was too girlish, and added a family name, Cameron, when told by the Actors' Equity Association that there was already a J. Smith, and there was a rule that two actors cannot have the same professional name.

Career
She made her Broadway debut in August 1982 when she replaced Mia Dillon as "Babe Botrelle" in Crimes of the Heart. She appeared in the original Broadway cast of Lend Me a Tenor as "Maggie" in 1989. The cast of that play won an Outer Critics Circle Award, Special Awards. She appeared in the Broadway production of Our Country's Good in 1991.

Additional Broadway credits include Night Must Fall (1999), Tartuffe (2002), and After the Night and the Music (2005).

She has appeared in many Off-Broadway plays, including at the Public Theater, the Second Stage Theatre, and Playwrights Horizons. She appeared in the Paul Rudnick play The Naked Truth Off-Broadway at the WPA Theatre in 1994. She received a Drama Desk Award nomination for this production.

In November 1999 through April 2000, she appeared in Fuddy Meers as Claire at New York City Center, Stage II, for which she received a nomination for the Outer Critics Circle Award as Outstanding Actress in a Play. In March through June 2004, she appeared in the Manhattan Theatre Club Off-Broadway production of Sarah, Sarah. In November through December 2009, she appeared Off-Broadway at the Acorn Theatre in her husband Kenneth Lonergan's play The Starry Messenger. From October 2013 to December 2013, she starred in the Off-Broadway Irish Repertory Theater production of Juno and the Paycock as Juno Boyle. The New York Times reviewer wrote: "In one of the finest performances of her distinguished career on the New York stage, Ms. Smith-Cameron imbues her Juno with a steely pragmatism, but more important an emotional pliancy that makes her more prepared than the rest of her clan to beat back the onslaughts of ill fortune that beset them."

Smith-Cameron began transitioning to more film and television roles later in her life to focus on her family life. She played Janet Talbot, the mother of a death row inmate, in Sundance TV's Rectify for four seasons. She has played lawyer Gerri Kellman, a role originally written for a man, on the HBO series Succession since 2018.

She won an Obie Award for the Off-Broadway Drama Department production As Bees in Honey Drown (1997), which also earned her a Drama Desk nomination and Outer Critics Circle Award nomination, Outstanding Actress In A Play. Additional nominations include the Drama Desk Award for Sarah, Sarah (2004) and the Tony Award for Best Featured Actress in the play Our Country's Good.

Personal life
Smith-Cameron is married to playwright, screenwriter, and film director Kenneth Lonergan. They have one daughter, Nellie.

Filmography

Film

Television
Sources: The New York Times

References

External links

Internet Off-Broadway Database Listing

1955 births
American film actresses
American stage actresses
American television actresses
Florida State University alumni
Actresses from Louisville, Kentucky
Actresses from South Carolina
Living people
21st-century American actresses
20th-century American actresses